Communist Albania maintained labour camps (meaning work camps) throughout the territories it controlled. The first Communist Albanian labour camps were around Tirana (although several other camp systems were developed in the north and south of the country as well). A number of camps existed between 1946 and 1991 during the Cold War. During the rule of Stalinist dictator Enver Hoxha, the Sigurimi secret police imprisoned thousands in forced-labour camps.

See also
Spaç Prison
Burrel Prison
Qafë Bar Prison

References

External links
Virtual Memory Museum of Albania 
List of imprisoned Bektashi clergy 

People's Socialist Republic of Albania
Unfree labour by country
Political repression
Labor in Albania